Valley Farms is an unincorporated town in Pinal County, Arizona, United States,  east of Coolidge. It has a post office with ZIP code 85191.

References

Populated places in Pinal County, Arizona